Pseudosparna amoena is a species of beetle in the family Cerambycidae. It was described by Mermudes and Monne in 2009.

References

Acanthocinini
Beetles described in 2009